The 1969–70 NBA season was the 76ers 21st Franchise season in the NBA and 7th season in Philadelphia. The season prior, Wilt Chamberlain was dealt to the Lakers. However, a more devastating trade was made before the 1969–70 season. Chet Walker, an all-star forward, was traded to the Chicago Bulls for Jim Washington, who played college ball in Philadelphia, and ended up having a journeyman career. Luke Jackson continued to be hobbled by a major injury sustained in the previous season & never played the same again. That, combined with a very poor draft, were factors in the team losing 13 more games than the previous campaign.

Draft picks

This table only displays picks through the second round.

Roster

Regular season

Season standings

Record vs. opponents

Game log

Playoffs

|- align="center" bgcolor="#ffcccc"
| 1
| March 25
| @ Milwaukee
| L 118–125
| Clark, Cunningham (21)
| Jim Washington (9)
| Greer, Jones (7)
| University of Wisconsin Field House9,686
| 0–1
|- align="center" bgcolor="#ccffcc"
| 2
| March 27
| @ Milwaukee
| W 112–105
| Billy Cunningham (37)
| Cunningham, Washington (10)
| Billy Cunningham (7)
| University of Wisconsin Field House9,686
| 1–1
|- align="center" bgcolor="#ffcccc"
| 3
| March 30
| Milwaukee
| L 120–156
| Archie Clark (20)
| Jim Washington (11)
| Bud Ogden (6)
| Spectrum15,244
| 1–2
|- align="center" bgcolor="#ffcccc"
| 4
| April 1
| Milwaukee
| L 111–118
| Billy Cunningham (50)
| Darrall Imhoff (16)
| Wali Jones (7)
| Spectrum14,206
| 1–3
|- align="center" bgcolor="#ffcccc"
| 5
| April 3
| @ Milwaukee
| L 106–115
| Billy Cunningham (28)
| Billy Cunningham (18)
| Hal Greer (6)
| University of Wisconsin Field House12,868
| 1–4
|-

Awards and records
Billy Cunningham, All-NBA First Team

References

Philadelphia 76ers seasons
Philadelphia
Philadel
Philadel